Pacific Appeal was an African-American newspaper based in San Francisco, California, and published from April 1862 to June 1880.

History 

Pacific Appeal was co-founded by Philip Alexander Bell, an African-American civil rights and antislavery activist who had established Weekly Advocate (edited by Samuel Cornish) and worked for William Lloyd Garrison's Liberator, and Peter Anderson, a San Francisco civil rights activist and delegate at the California Colored Citizens Convention. It was the successor to the Mirror of the Times, another San Francisco-based African-American newspaper that had been established in 1855, with the change of name occurring along with a change of proprietor from Judge Mifflin W. Gibbs to William H. Carter. Its contemporaries at the time included the Anglo-African, and it was regarded as the official organ of African-Americans on the Pacific slope.

The paper’s motto was “He who would be free, himself must strike the blow.” It began publishing in April 1862.

Later, Bell and Anderson would split, with Bell accusing Anderson of becoming less antislavery and more accommodationist.

External coverage 

The coverage of antislavery and civil rights issues in the first few years has been covered by historians and chroniclers of black abolitionism of the era, including in The Afro-American Press and Its Editors.

Notable content 

The inaugural 1862 volume contained eight antislavery poems, including four poems by San Francisco poet James Madison Bell, writing under the initials JMB.

Pacific Appeal also published some 250 proclamations by Emperor Norton, self-proclaimed Emperor of the United States, including his proposals for what would later become the San Francisco–Oakland Bay Bridge and the Transbay Tube.

See also 
List of African-American newspapers in California

References 

Defunct African-American newspapers
Publications established in 1862
Publications disestablished in 1880
Defunct newspapers published in California
Newspapers published in San Francisco
1862 establishments in California
1880 disestablishments in the United States